The Chicago American Gears were a National Basketball League (NBL) team who played from 1944 to 1947. The team also played in the Professional Basketball League of America (PBLA) in 1947–48 after leaving the NBL.

About
They are notable in professional basketball history for two things.  First, they were the rookie year pro team of basketball legend George Mikan. Mikan had starred at local DePaul University as a collegian. After holding out for several weeks for money he felt owed him by the Gears, Mikan joined the team early enough to help them finish with a third-place record in the West Division of the 10-team National Basketball League that season. Nearly seven feet tall, Mikan then led playoff upsets for the Gears over three teams en route to the 1947 NBL Championship, then widely considered the most prestigious title in pro basketball. 
Secondly, Gears owner Maurice White was so impressed with Mikan that, after winning the 1947 NBL title, he announced he was leaving the NBL to form his own league, the ambitious 24-team Professional Basketball League of America. 
Start-up costs proved prohibitive, however, and crowds for PBLA games were often very small. After several weeks the entire league collapsed, with the Gears folding as well.

Previous to their NBL pro success, the Gears had also been a notable AAU team.

The 1946-47 Season
The 1946–47 Chicago American Gears season was the Gears' third year in the United States' National Basketball League (NBL), which was also the tenth year the league existed. Twelve teams competed in the NBL in 1946–47, comprising six teams in both the Eastern and Western Divisions.

Chicago played their home games at International Amphitheatre.Despite finishing tied for third place in the Western Division, the American Gears made a surprise playoffs run by winning the first series three games to two (3–2) over the Indianapolis Kautskys, followed by a 2–0 sweep of Oshkosh All-Stars in the semifinals. They then went on to win their first league championship 3–1 over Eastern Division champion Rochester Royals.

Player-coach Bobby McDermott (First Team), George Mikan (First), and Bob Calihan (Second) earned All-NBL honors .

References

 
1944 establishments in Illinois
1947 disestablishments in Illinois
Basketball teams established in 1944
Basketball teams disestablished in 1947